Adness Co. Ltd. (アドネス株式会社, Adonesu Kabushiki-gaisha), known in the United States as Adness Entertainment, is an entertainment company based in Tokyo, with offices in Los Angeles.

History 
Adness Entertainment is involved in the production, worldwide distribution and merchandise licensing of original children's television entertainment. Parent company Adness Co., Ltd. distributes home entertainment in Japan.

The American branch was initially registered under the name CloverwayAdness. Cloverway Inc., the company that served as registered agent for Toei Animation, closed in 2007, the year after Adness Entertainment was established.

As of 2021, the company has filed a forfeit of all business activities. This, along with their website and social media accounts being inactive since 2017, essentially renders them defunct.

Television
Kamen Rider: Dragon Knight was an adaptation of Toei's Kamen Rider Ryuki. It is also its only product ever successfully produced.

In the early licensing information for the series, there were plans for a feature-length movie for the show. In an interview, Steve Wang stated that they had written a story for a film, but Adness was raising money to bring over another Heisei Kamen Rider for broadcast in the United States someday, rather than a film or a second season of Dragon Knight.  No such plans materialized.

References

External links
Official Site 

Television production companies of the United States